Laura Molina Fernández (born 13 September 1988) is a Spanish badminton player.

She played at the 2005 World Badminton Championships in Anaheim. In the women's singles event she retired in her first round match. She trailed Yip Pui Yin of Hong Kong 1-11, 0-7 when she decided to end the match. In the mixed doubles event (partnering Carlos Longo) she also lost in the first round.

Achievements

BWF International Challenge/Series 

Mixed doubles

 BWF International Challenge tournament
 BWF International Series tournament
 BWF Future Series tournament

References

External links 
 

Spanish female badminton players
Living people
1988 births
Badminton players at the 2015 European Games
European Games competitors for Spain
21st-century Spanish women